The Battle of Sutlej was fought by Guru Har Rai's Sikhs and Muhammad Yarbeg Khan's Mughal forces in 1652. Muhammad Yarbeg Khan was the grandson of Mukhlis Khan, a Mughal who was killed by Guru Hargobind.

Background

Bhai Gaura was the eldest son of Bhai Bhagtu, a devotee of the 5th, 6th and 7th Sikh Guru. He had killed someone who was part of Guru Har Rai's hunting party. After this Guru Ji had forbade Gaura to enter his presence. For the next few months Bhai Gaura followed Guru Har Rai to everywhere he went, crawling in his shadows.

Battle

Once Guru Har Rai and his bodyguards were walking along the Sutlej River. There they met Mughal troops which were marching from Lahore to Delhi. One of the Mughal officers, who was the grandson of Mukhlis Khan who had killed by Guru Hargobind, inquired the name of the party and upon knowning that it was Guru Har Rai, he immediately attacked  seeking revenge. Bhai Gaura came out of the shadows and defended Guru Har Rai with his troops. Usually, Guru Ji had tried to avoid conflicts. But this time with the help of Bhai Gaura's troops he fought the Mughals valiantly until they fled away. Muhammad Yarbeg Khan was slain by Bhai Gaura himself. Bhai Gaura bought time for Guru's party to safely cross the river.

Aftermath

After this battle Bhai Gaura was pardoned by the Guru which meant Bhai Gaura can go back to his territory instead of following Guru ji.

See also 

 Nihang
 Battle of Amritsar (1634)
 Mughal Empire

References

Battles involving the Sikhs